The Battle of Dubravnica was fought in the summer of 1380 or December 1381, on the Dubravnica River near Paraćin in today's central Serbia, between the Serbian forces of Prince Lazar of Serbia led by commanders Vitomir and Crep and the invading Ottoman Turks of Sultan Murad I. Vitomir and Crep were the regional lords, and one of their fortresses, Petrus, was in the vicinity of the battle. 

The Battle of Dubravnica was the first historical mention of any Ottoman movements into Prince Lazar's territory. The Serbian army emerged victorious, although details of the battle itself are scarce. After this battle the Turks didn't venture into Serbia until 1386, when their armies were routed near Pločnik.

{{Quote_box|
width=150px
|align=center
|quote="In the summer of 1380, Crep and Vitomir kills (defeats) the Turks on Dubravica"
|source= -Lazar's chronicles
|}}

See also
Battle of Pločnik
Battle of Bileća
Battle of Kosovo

References

Sources

 
 Marko Šuica, „Nemirno doba srpskog srednjeg veka“, Beograd, 2000. 
 „Istorija srpskog naroda II“, Beograd, 1982.
 Ljubomir Stojanovic, "Start srpski rodoslovi i letopisi: Zbornik za istoriju, jezik, i knjilemost srpskog naroda"'', XVI (1927): 214.

External links
 Battle of Kosovo, about the battle and surrounding facts

1380 in Europe
1381 in Europe
14th century in Serbia
Battles of the Ottoman–Serbian Wars
Conflicts in 1380
Conflicts in 1381
1380 in the Ottoman Empire
1381 in the Ottoman Empire
Battles involving Serbia in the Middle Ages